When I Was Born for the 7th Time is the third studio album by the English indie rock band Cornershop, released on 8 September 1997 by Wiiija. The album received high acclaim from music critics and features the international hit single "Brimful of Asha".

Recording and release 
When I Was Born for the 7th Time was recorded over a period of approximately two months. Singer and guitarist Tjinder Singh described the recording process as "very intense. There was a lot of smoking going on, it was a very relaxed time, and very enjoyable all the way through. At the end, our engineer had to go for medical assistance. He got freaked out. He smoked so much and then he stopped and he went loopy. He was on medication. His body couldn't take it." The album was released on 8 September 1997 by the independent record label Wiiija. The song "Brimful of Asha" was released as a single and became an international hit. The track "Candyman" was used in a Nike commercial featuring LeBron James, while "Good Shit" was featured in a commercial for Target with the chorus being altered to read "Good Stuff ..."; in the single release and in the video played on MTV Europe the title was "Good Ships". As of February 2002, the album has sold 198,000 copies in the U.S. according to Nielsen SoundScan.

Critical reception 

When I Was Born for the 7th Time received high acclaim from music critics. Writing for Rolling Stone, Neva Chonin opined that the album "is a cohesive, finely crafted LP in which the last album's low-fi funk expands into low, fat grooves, and Singh's pancultural, anti-racist lyrics become more sophisticated but no less impassioned." Robert Christgau of The Village Voice called it "an international pop so seamless that its fusion of alt-rock, Punjabi melody, hip hop, and what-all is subsumed into its own song-based catchiness". In 1998, the album was ranked at number three in The Village Voices Pazz & Jop critics' poll for 1997. Similarly, Spin journalists placed the album at number one in their list of Top 20 Albums of the Year. In 2000, Q magazine placed the album at number 68 in its list of 100 Greatest British Albums. The album was also included in the book 1001 Albums You Must Hear Before You Die.

Track listing

Personnel 
Credits are adapted from the album's album notes.

Cornershop
 Tjinder Singh – vocals, guitar, scratching, dholki
 Ben Ayres – tamboura, guitar, keyboards
 Anthony Saffery – sitar, harmonium, keyboards 
 Nick Simms – drums
 Peter Bengry – percussion

Additional musicians
 Robert Buller – strings ("Brimful of Asha")
 Elizabeth Johnson – strings ("Brimful of Asha")
 Grace Winder – strings ("Brimful of Asha")
 Allen Ginsberg – vocals ("When the Light Appears Boy")
 Lourdes Belart – vocals ("Good Shit")
 Paula Frazer – vocals ("Good to Be on the Road Back Home")
 Ray Dickaty – flute ("Good to Be on the Road Back Home")
 Justin Warfield – rapping ("Candyman")

Technical
 Tjinder Singh – production (tracks 1., 2., 4. – 12., 14., 15.)
 Dan the Automator – production (tracks 1., 10., 13.)
 Daddy Rappaport – production (track 3.)
 Alan Gregson – engineering
 Philip Bagenal – engineering
 Mike Marsh – mastering
 Deborah Norcross – art direction and design
 Catalina Gonzales – front cover photography
 Thomas Bayrle – inside illustration
 Frank Maddocks – afro illustration

Charts

Certifications

References

External links 

1997 albums
Cornershop albums
Albums produced by Dan the Automator
Wiiija albums
Electronic albums by English artists
Avant-pop albums